Dargo Ktor is a fictional superhero appearing in American comic books published by Marvel Comics. He lived in a distant  dystopian future, where people of earth are oppressed by the oppressive corp. He becomes the Thor of that future after realising that he is worthy to lift mjolnir and thus fights the oppressive corp  and Loki to save his people from the oppressive regime. 

Debuting in the Modern Age of Comic Books, the character first appeared in Thor volume 1 #384 and was created by Tom Defalco and Ron Frenz.
Dargo Ktor is mostly based on
Thor with his features being relatively similar to  the former character.

Fictional character biography

Dargo Ktor lived in an alternate earth in the distant future which is ruled by the oppressive Corp.
He was a part of cult of hammer, whom worshiped  Thor's hammer Mjolnir believing  that someone would be worthy of lifting Mjolnir might prove worthy to lift it, and gain Thor's power and save their future. Dargo was skeptical at first,bur eventually  lift Mjolnir and this gained Thor's powers and becomes an avatar of Thor.
Dargo fights off Loki s minions, where it is revealed that loki was allied with the corp all along  and has tricked his brother Thor by exiling him  into a different dimension. After Dargo learns that Thor cannot return without Mjolnir 's help, he sents Mjolnir through the dimensional portal.

Some time later, Mjolnir returns to Dargo for unknown reasons  and he resumes being Thor, battling the Demonstaff and is briefly  used as a pawn against Earth-616's Fantastic Four by Zarrko the Tomorrow Man. Zarrko fools Dargo into traveling back in time to Earth-616 to attack Eric Masterson, then Thor's modern-day avatar, whom Zarrko claimed had stolen Thor's hammer. Dargo fought both Eric and Stellaris before Beta Ray Bill, another "Thor" intervened and foiled Zarrko's deception. Zarrko intended to siphon the combined energy from Eric and Dargo's hammers to power his Radical Time Stabilizer and collapse the multiverse into a single timeline, but together the Thors overcame Zarrko and Dargo returned to his own timeline.

Dargo Ktor was the last champion of Midgard. He opposed Thor's half-brother Loki. At some point, he was left for dead by Loki in the ruins of Minneapolis, with his wife and other relatives being killed. Years later,Tannan Six was driven by his curiosity stole both Mjolnir and Captain America's Shield and ran away from Loki.He met a fugitive from Loki, who told him about the Avengers. Aided by Hercules, Thaddeus Stark and Deva Van Dyne, they reassembled the Avengers and went out in Minneapolis to find Dargo and convinced him to reclaim his mantle as Thor and fight for good.

Powers and abilities
Dargo Ktor is worthy of Mjolnir and hence possesses a portion of all of Thor's powers and abilities such as superhuman strength, speed, durability , electric and weather manipulation etc.
When Dargo Ktor and Eric masterson clashed, it caused a huge tear in universal reality which was comparable to the  Big Bang.

See also
Thor (Marvel Comics)
Alternative versions of Thor (Marvel Comics)

References

Comics characters introduced in 1993

External links

Dargo Ktor at Marvel

Characters created by Tom DeFalco
Characters created by Ron Frenz
Fictional characters from parallel universes
Fictional characters with electric or magnetic abilities
Fictional hammer fighters
Marvel Comics 2
Marvel Comics superheroes
Marvel Comics characters who can move at superhuman speeds
Marvel Comics characters who use magic
Marvel Comics characters with accelerated healing
Marvel Comics characters with superhuman strength